Classification Commune des Actes Médicaux is a French medical classification for clinical procedures. Starting in 2005, the CCAM serves as the reimbursement classification for clinicians. The CCAM was evaluated using OpenGALEN tools and technologies.

This classification is used to establish

 In private practice and hospital fees for acts performed during technical consultations
 In private clinics, the fees for procedures performed
 In public and private hospitals, the DRG and its pricing of hospital stays provided to health insurance as part of T2  A.

The choice of acts of this nomenclature is up to the Evaluation Commission of Acts Professionals (CEAP) of the High Authority of Health

It coexists with the Nomenclature Générale des Actes Professionnels (NGAP).

Structure 
In the version V2, the ACPC 7623 codes included. Each is accompanied by wording to clarify its meaning unambiguously followed by its price in euros and tariff details.

Code Principal
Explicit hierarchical coding. This code and / or its title in the presence of personally identifiable information may impair the protection of people and lift the confidentiality of those who entrust themselves to organizations and managed care organization.

Each code comprises the four letters and three numbers.
 The first letter refers to a large anatomical unit;
 The second letter indicates the body (or function) in the unit corresponding to the first letter;
 The third letter denotes the action performed;
 The fourth letter identifies the surgical approach or technique used.

The next three digits are used to differentiate between acts with four identical letters keys.

e.g. HHFA001: Appendectomy, for the first quadrant

                       HH. F A. 001
                       Action Technical topography Counter

Hierarchical ACPC

CCAM codes are structured in a tree whose top-level comprises 19 chapters, organized mainly by large anatomical structure or function:

 01. central nervous system, device and independent
 02. eye and notes
 03. ear
 04. circulatory
 05. immune system and hematopoietic
 06. respiratory
 07. digestive
 08. urinary and genital
 09. acts on the reproductive, pregnancy and the newborn
 10. endocrine and metabolic
 11. osteoarticular apparatus and muscle of the head
 12. osteoarticular apparatus and muscle neck and trunk
 13. osteoarticular apparatus and muscle of the upper limb
 14. osteoarticular apparatus and muscle of lower limb
 15. osteoarticular apparatus and muscle without precision surveying
 16. integumentary system - mammary glands
 17. acts without precision surveying
 18. anesthetic actions and additional statements
 19. transitional adjustments to the acpc

The second level separates the diagnostic and therapeutic procedures, it is optionally followed by one or more sub-levels.

Modifiers acts and association
Some acts may receive more than their one or more main code details called Modifiers.
A modifier is information associated with a label that identifies a particular criterion for the performance of an act or his recovery. It applies to a specific list of acts. Modifiers are explicitly allowed in respect of each of the acts concerned. The application of a modifier leads to a rate increase of the act. Only modifiers can be charged in connection with acts that have a tariff. The description of these modifiers is found in Article III-2 of Book III of the General Provisions official. Four modifiers than can be priced by deed.

In the context of pricing, the association of acts is the realization of several acts at the same time, for the same patient by the same doctor, since there is no incompatibility between these acts. Codes 1,2,3,4 or 5 and their application rates of these associations are listed in Article III-3 of Paper III.

Versions of CCAM
Version 22 of theTechnical''ACPC will be applicable on September 30, 2013 for clinics and public hospitals.  Version 21 shall be in use until that date.

The construction of theclinical ACPC''' on intellectual activities that is to say without tools or technical movement provided by the medical convention of 2005 was due to start before 2007. A survey of clinicians from FIFG is announced for late 2010.

Revision history 
http://www.ameli.fr/fileadmin/user_upload/documents/DATE_CCAM.pdf:

 ACPC's V23 01.25.2011 Official Journal of 26 December 2010 applicable as of January 25, 2011
 V22 ACPC of 30/09/2010 (bariatric surgery, hyperbaric medicine, respiratory support, ...)
 ACPC V21 from 25/05/2010 (recasting of Anatomy Cyto Pathology)
 V20 ACPC 01/05/2010 (recast EBRT)
 ACPC V19 from 01/02/2010
 V18 ACPC 01/01/2010
 V17 ACPC of 19/10/2009
 V16 ACPC 28/05/2009
 ACPC V15 from 21/12/2008 (12001 codes acts)
 ACPC V14, 16/10/2008
 ACPC V13 from 01/05/2008
 V12 ACPC of 14/03/2008
 ACPC 28/12/2007
 V11 (7838 rate changes compared to version 10).
 V10 ACPC of 12/09/2007
 ACPC V9 of 28/06/2007
 V8 ACPC on 16/05/2007
 ACPC V7 of 16/04/2007
 ACPC's V6 16/09/2006
 ACPC V2 from 01/09/2005
 ACPC V1 25/03/2005
 ACPC V0bis, 27/11/2003
 V0 ACPC, 2002

Learn more about the site Health Insurance = 000310000000's ATIH

References

External links 
 The site of the ACPC
 Evaluation Commission Acts Professionals (CEAP) of the Haute Autorité de Santé (HAS)
 [Search http://www.codage.ext.cnamts.fr/codif/ccam/ acts in the ACPC]
 FAQs on the ACPC
 ACPC website of Health Insurance
 the website ATIH
 Rover: free software for viewing and research in the ACPC

Clinical procedure classification